Hammam-Lif (pronounced hammam linf) is a coastal town about 20 km south-east of Tunis, the capital of Tunisia. It has been known since antiquity for its thermal springs originating in Mount Bou Kornine.

History 
Naro, which means fire, was Hammam-Lif's Punic name. In 1883, the French captain Ernest De Prudhomme discovered in his Hammam-lif residence the first archeological ruins of an ancient synagogue that once stood in Hammam-Lif in 3rd-5th century AD.

Hammam-Lif was once the home of Italian, Greek and Jewish communities, especially before the end of the French colonial period.

Hammam-Lif's most interesting site is probably Dar El Bey, which was the residence of Ali II Bey, the 4th bey of Tunis.

Sport
The local football team Club Sportif de Hammam-Lif won the Tunisian championship in 1952, 1954, 1955, 1956 and won the Tunisian Cup in 1946, 1947, 1948, 1949, 1950, 1985, 2001

Notable people
Ahmed Achour (1945-2021), conductor and composer
Wajiha Jendoubi (1960-), actress and comedian
Aly Ben Ayed (1930-1972), actor and director
Férid Boughedir (1944-), film director and screenwriter
Abdelmajid Lakhal (1939-2014), film actor and theater director
Témime Lahzami (1949-), football player
Selma Baccar (1945-), filmmaker and producer
Noureddine Kasbaoui (1931-1996), actor and director
Mouna Noureddine (1937-), actress
Walid Mattar (1980-), film director

References

External links 
 Information and pictures
 CSHL: Hammam-Lif's soccer team

Populated places in Ben Arous Governorate
Seaside resorts in Tunisia
Communes of Tunisia
Spa towns in Tunisia